Ponte do Saber ("Bridge of Knowledge") is a cable-stayed bridge in Rio de Janeiro, Brazil.

Designed by architect Alexandre Chan and completed in 2012, the bridge connects the  campus of the Federal University of Rio de Janeiro (UFRJ) to the southbound Red Line expressway that leads to downtown Rio de Janeiro. The bridge was inaugurated and opened to traffic on 17 of February 2012.

References

Bridges in Rio de Janeiro (city)
Cable-stayed bridges in Brazil
Federal University of Rio de Janeiro
Guanabara Bay
Bridges completed in 2012